Marwan ibn Muhammad's invasion of Georgia took place from 735 to 737. It was initiated by the Umayyad Caliphate. The goals of the campaign are disputed among historians. The Georgian historiography insists its main purpose was to finally break the stiff Georgian resistance against Arab rule, however, the western historians such as Cyril Toumanoff, and Ronald Suny, view it as a general campaign directed at both the Byzantine Empire, who exerted dominion over Western Georgia, and the Khazars, whose repeated raids affected not only Iberia (Eastern Georgia) and the whole Caucasus, but had in 730 reached Arab lands all the way to Mosul.

The invasion
The invasion was led by Marwan ibn Muhammad, who later became the last Umayyad caliph Marwan II. He first campaigned in Kartli, after which he led his armies to the west and besieged the fortress of Anakopia, where Archil of Kakheti and his brother Mihr, who were assisted by Leon I of Abkhazia, were stationed. The Arabs failed to take the fortress and were forced to retreat. Fearing an onslaught, large numbers of Georgians fled to the mountainous regions. Marwan later invaded Samtskhe, encamped in Odzrkhe and led his forces against the princes of Argveti, Constantine and David, from whom, upon their capture, he demanded unconditional conversion to Islam, which both refused. He tortured and then killed them for their refusal. After that, Marwan took Tshkumi (modern Sukhumi) and Tsikhegoji and again turned to Anakopia. The Arabs could not take the fortress, especially after heavy rains and floods began, and retreated with heavy losses.

Legacy
Marwan's cruelty and ruthlessness was epitomized by the Georgians by naming him Murvan Qru ("Marwan the Deaf"). After his campaign, most major settlements were utterly ruined and people faced starvation. If Georgian historiography insists that Kartli was devastated by the invasion, Toumanoff, relying on local and Arab sources, claims that most of the damage in the Eastern part of the country was actually the result of the previous Khazar raids, and that the local Georgian prince, Guaram III of Iberia, actually sided with the Arabs in order to repeal them beyond the Caucasian range. In any case, the Arab intervention gave them more power over Iberia than they had managed to attain in almost a century of previous conquests. They established the Emirate of Tbilisi to exert direct control over Iberia, even though the Principate of Iberia was not abolished, and local nobility retained most of their power. Because civil instability and foreign enemies were plaguing the caliphate, it was unable to launch another invasion and until 786 settled upon receiving irregular tributes from the Georgian local princes.

References

Invasions by the Umayyad Caliphate
Invasions of Georgia (country)
Georgia
8th century in Georgia (country)
730s in the Umayyad Caliphate
Wars involving Georgia (country)